Cynanchum pulchellum is an Asian species of liana in the family Apocynaceae.  Its known distribution includes:  Guangxi, Thailand, India, Nepal, Sikkim, Laos, Peninsular Malaysia, Myanmar and Vietnam.  Before 2016, it was the type species of the genus Raphistemma.

References

External links
 
 

Indochina
pulchellum